Zhang Yuan (born 28 January 1997) is a Chinese footballer who currently plays for Chinese Super League side Shenzhen FC.

Club career
Zhang Yuan joined Dalian Aerbin's youth academy in 2013 after Dalian Shide dissolved. He was loaned to Portuguese side Mafra in the summer of 2013 and joined Loures in 2015. Zhang was promoted to Loures's first team squad in July 2016. He made his senior debut on 4 December 2016 in a 2–0 away win over Atlético CP, coming on as a substitute for Ivo Miranda in the 80th minute. He played four league matches for Loures in the 2016–17 season.

Zhang transferred to Chinese Super League side Tianjin Quanjian in July 2017. On 10 September 2017, he made his debut for Tianjin Quanjian in a 3–1 home win over Guizhou Hengfeng Zhicheng, coming on for Wang Yongpo in the 76th minute when Tianjin was leading 3–0.

On 26 February 2018, Zhang was loaned to fellow Super League side Guizhou Hengfeng for one season. On 11 March 2018, he made his debut for the club in a 3–2 home defeat against Hebei China Fortune, replacing Min Junlin in the 88th minute. On 25 April 2018, he scored his first senior goal in a 2–1 away win over Heilongjiang Lava Spring in the 4th round of 2018 Chinese FA Cup.

In July 2020, Zhang was one of eight former Tianjin Tianhai players to sign with Shenzhen FC. He would go on to make his debut on 26 July 2020 in a league game against Guangzhou R&F F.C. in a 3-0 victory.

Career statistics
.

References

External links
 

1997 births
Living people
Chinese footballers
Footballers from Dalian
GS Loures players
Tianjin Tianhai F.C. players
Guizhou F.C. players
Shenzhen F.C. players
Segunda Divisão players
Chinese Super League players
Chinese expatriate footballers
Expatriate footballers in Portugal
Chinese expatriate sportspeople in Portugal
Association football midfielders
Footballers at the 2018 Asian Games
Asian Games competitors for China